Joaquín Varela Moreno (born 27 June 1998) is a Uruguayan professional footballer who plays as a centre-back.

Club career
Varela started his career with Defensor Sporting. He was selected for his professional debut in February 2016 by manager Juan Tejera, who played him for the full duration of a home defeat to Racing Club. Liga MX team Pachuca loaned Varela in 2017, with the defender joining up with the U20 team. He made nine appearances for Pachuca's youth team, prior to returning to Defensor Sporting. On 1 March 2018, Villa Española of the Uruguayan Segunda División completed the loan signing of Varela. He scored his first senior goal on 2 June against Albion, though he received a straight red card later in the match.

In 2019, Varela joined Fénix. In the following September, Varela departed on loan to European football with Cypriot First Division side Pafos. He didn't appear competitively in 2019–20 due to injury, though was on the substitute's bench for a league match with Apollon Limassol on 14 September. Despite this, the club renewed his loan for a further year ahead of the 2020–21 campaign. He debuted in a goalless draw away to Enosis Neon Paralimni on 23 November.

International career
Varela represented Uruguay at the 2015 South American U-17 Championship in Paraguay, winning eight caps in the process; notably his first in their Group B opener with Bolivia.

Career statistics
.

References

External links

1998 births
Living people
Footballers from Montevideo
Uruguayan footballers
Uruguay youth international footballers
Association football defenders
Uruguayan expatriate footballers
Expatriate footballers in Mexico
Expatriate footballers in Cyprus
Uruguayan expatriate sportspeople in Mexico
Uruguayan expatriate sportspeople in Cyprus
Uruguayan Primera División players
Uruguayan Segunda División players
Cypriot First Division players
Defensor Sporting players
C.F. Pachuca players
Villa Española players
Centro Atlético Fénix players
Pafos FC players